Galium fosbergii is a species of plant in the family Rubiaceae. It is endemic to Ecuador.

Sources

Endemic flora of Ecuador
fosbergii
Endangered plants
Taxonomy articles created by Polbot